Tre McBride (born December 1, 1992) is a former American football wide receiver. He played college football at William & Mary, and was drafted by the Tennessee Titans in the seventh round of the 2015 NFL Draft.

Early years
McBride attended Ola High School in McDonough, Georgia. He played on the football team and had 1,500 all-purpose yards as a senior and 1,000 as a junior. He also lettered in basketball and track & field, where he had personal-bests of 24.00 seconds in the 200-meter dash, 1.83 meters (6 feet) in the high jump and 13.0 meters (42 feet, 6.5 inches) in the triple jump

College career
McBride played at the College of William & Mary from 2011 to 2014. As a freshman, he played in all 11 games and had 14 receptions for 146 yards. He was the first freshman wide receiver to play for William & Mary since 2005. As a sophomore, McBride started all 11 games and led the team with 55 receptions for 897 yards and 10 touchdowns. As a junior, he started 11 of 12 games and again led the team with 63 receptions for 801 yards and five touchdowns. He was also the kick returner and led the team with 1,533 total all-purpose yards. As a senior, he had 64 receptions for 809 yards and four touchdowns. Against Villanova, he set the school record for most all-purpose yards in a game with 359.

Professional career
McBride played in the 2015 East–West Shrine Game, where he impressed and improved his stock for the 2015 NFL Draft.

Tennessee Titans
McBride was drafted by the Tennessee Titans in the seventh round, 245th overall, in the 2015 NFL Draft. On September 5, 2015, he was waived and was signed to the practice squad the next day. On November 17, 2015, McBride was elevated to the active roster. 

McBride was waived by the Titans on September 5, 2016. The next day, he was signed to the Titans' practice squad. He was promoted to the active roster on November 1, 2016.

On September 2, 2017, McBride was waived by the Titans.

Chicago Bears
On September 3, 2017, McBride was claimed off waivers by the Chicago Bears. He was waived on September 23, 2017 and was re-signed to the practice squad. He was promoted back to the active roster on October 2, 2017. He was waived on November 28, 2017.

New York Jets
On December 1, 2017, McBride was signed to the New York Jets' practice squad. He signed a reserve/future contract with the Jets on January 1, 2018.

On September 1, 2018, McBride was waived by the Jets.

Washington Redskins
On January 2, 2019, McBride signed a reserve/future contract with the Washington Redskins, with him later being waived on April 30, 2019.

Jacksonville Jaguars
On June 13, 2019, McBride signed with the Jacksonville Jaguars. He was waived on August 31, 2019.

DC Defenders
McBride was drafted in the 2nd round in the 2020 XFL Draft by the DC Defenders.

Los Angeles Wildcats
McBride was traded to the Los Angeles Wildcats in exchange for wide receiver Rashad Ross on January 12, 2020. He had his contract terminated when the league suspended operations on April 10, 2020.

References

External links
William & Mary Tribe bio

1992 births
Living people
People from McDonough, Georgia
Players of American football from Georgia (U.S. state)
American football wide receivers
William & Mary Tribe football players
Tennessee Titans players
Chicago Bears players
New York Jets players
Washington Redskins players
Jacksonville Jaguars players
DC Defenders players
Los Angeles Wildcats (XFL) players